The B30 is an inline-six automotive petrol engine produced by Volvo starting in 1968. It was used primarily in the Volvo 164 sedan from 1969 through 1975. The engine also appeared in military, marine, industrial, agricultural, and powercraft applications.

History
In March 1958 Volvo launched Project 358 to design a new large model with Chief Designer Jan Wilsgaard taking the lead. The original plan for this car was to use the V8 engine that had been developed for the Volvo Philip concept car of 1952. That engine, which was later called the B36, was rejected in favour of a new inline six. The engine for Project 358 was developed by adding two cylinders to the existing B18, resulting in a six-cylinder engine with a displacement of 2.7 litres. Project B358 did not go into production, but most of the early work done on it was revived when development began on the 164, including the six cylinder engine.

Bore and stroke for the 164's engine were based on the larger B20 inline four, resulting in an engine displacing 3.0 litres. Due to their common heritage, many components are shared between the B20 and B30, including pistons, connecting rods, valves and valve-train parts.

The B30A was used in the Marcos GT from 1969 to 1972 and the Volvo C303 from 1974 to 1984. The B30 from the 164 was also used in the 1970 Volvo GTZ 3000 concept car.

Marine application versions of the B30 were sold by Volvo's Penta division. These engines carried designations AQ 165A and AQ 170A, B, or C. They were equipped with three down-draught carburettors. and P type camshaft.

Technical detail
Like the B20 that it was developed from, the B30 has a cast iron block and cylinder head. The single camshaft is in the block, and operates the two overhead valves per cylinder through pushrods and rocker arms.

The B30/B30A version used twin 175CD2SE constant-depression Zenith-Stromberg carburettors. Both the B30E and B30F used the D-Jetronic fuel injection system from Bosch.

There are three major variations of this engine:

In 1974 the number of bolts holding the flywheel increased from 6 to 8 and the size of the connecting rods was increased.

See also
 List of Volvo engines

References

Further reading

B30
Straight-six engines
Gasoline engines by model